Country Pond is a  water body located in Rockingham County in southern New Hampshire, United States, in the towns of Kingston and Newton. Water from Country Pond flows via the Powwow River to the Merrimack River in Amesbury, Massachusetts.

The lake is classified as a warmwater fishery, with observed species including smallmouth bass, largemouth bass, chain pickerel, brown bullhead, black crappie, white perch, American eel, bluegill, white sucker, and pumpkinseed.

See also

List of lakes in New Hampshire

References

Lakes of Rockingham County, New Hampshire